is a Japanese football player. He plays for Vegalta Sendai.

Career
Takuma Hamasaki joined Japan Football League club FC Osaka in 2015. In 2017, he moved to J2 League club Mito HollyHock.

Club statistics
Updated to January 1, 2021.

References

External links
Profile at Mito HollyHock

1993 births
Living people
Osaka Gakuin University alumni
Association football people from Osaka Prefecture
Japanese footballers
J1 League players
J2 League players
Japan Football League players
FC Osaka players
Mito HollyHock players
Vegalta Sendai players
Matsumoto Yamaga FC players
People from Settsu, Osaka
Association football defenders